Toshihiro is a masculine Japanese given name.

Possible writings
Toshihiro can be written using different combinations of kanji characters. Some examples: 

敏弘, "agile, vast"
敏宏, "agile, wide"
敏浩, "agile, wide"
敏博, "agile, doctor"
敏広, "agile, wide"
敏洋, "agile, ocean"
敏裕, "agile, abundant"
俊弘, "talented, vast"
俊裕, "talented, abundant"
俊博, "talented, doctor"
俊大, "talented, big"
寿広, "long life, wide"
寿弘, "long life, vast"
利弘, "benefit, vast"
年弘, "year, vast"

The name can also be written in hiragana としひろ or katakana トシヒロ.

Notable people with the name

, Japanese footballer
, Japanese rower
, Japanese Nordic combined skier
, Japanese footballer
, Japanese footballer
, Japanese alpine skier
, Japanese racing driver
, Japanese animator
, Japanese footballer
, Japanese video game designer and producer
, Japanese politician
, Japanese manga artist
, Japanese karateka
, Japanese long-distance runner
, Japanese Go player
, Japanese Paralympic athlete
, Japanese philanthropist
, Japanese footballer
, Japanese footballer
, Japanese footballer
, Japanese footballer

Japanese masculine given names